Triana is a village in Tuscany, central Italy,  administratively a frazione of the comune of Roccalbegna, province of Grosseto, in the southern area of Mount Amiata. At the time of the 2001 census its population amounted to 14.

Triana is about 50 km from Grosseto and 5 km from Roccalbegna.

Main sights 
 San Bernardino, main parish of the village, it was built in 1780 by Piccolomini.
 Chapel of Madonna del Loreto (17th century), little chapel of the castle.
 Castle of Triana, medieval castle once ruled by the Aldobrandeschi.

References

See also 
 Cana, Tuscany
 Santa Caterina, Roccalbegna
 Vallerona

Frazioni of Roccalbegna